Ray Jordan (born 21 October 1994) is a West Indies Under-19s cricketer who played at the 2014 Under-19 World Cup. He was born in Kingstown, St Vincent. He made his first-class debut for the Windward Islands in the 2017–18 Regional Four Day Competition on 2 November 2017. In October 2019, he was named in the Windward Islands' squad for the 2019–20 Regional Super50 tournament. He made his List A debut on 7 November 2019, for the Windward Islands in the 2019–20 Regional Super50 tournament.

References

External links
 
 

Living people
1994 births
Saint Vincent and the Grenadines cricketers
People from Kingstown
Saint Lucia Kings cricketers
Windward Islands cricketers